Star Wars: The Essential Guide To Characters is a book by Andy Mangels published by Boxtree in 1995.

Contents
Star Wars: The Essential Guide To Characters is an alphabetical listing of characters, each featuring a line drawing, vital statistics such as height, preferred weapons and politics, and up to several pages of biography.

Reception
Andy Butcher reviewed Star Wars: The Essential Guide To Characters for Arcane magazine, rating it a 5 out of 10 overall. Butcher comments that "although the biographies are somewhat disappointing - for the most part just detailing the actions of the character in the films and not really revealing anything new they do summarise the plots of the various books and comic stories. It's this that might make Star Wars: The Essential Guide To Characters worthy of purchase."

Reviews
Review by Pam Meek (1996) in Absolute Magnitude, Fall 1996
Magia i Miecz #65 (May 1999) (Polish)

References

Books based on Star Wars